Saratu Atta is a Ghanaian administrator and lawyer. She is a member of the New Patriotic Party and the current Personal Assistant for the President of Ghana.

Early life and career
Saratu was born to a Ghanaian mother and a Nigerian father, her father Adamu Atta from Adavi Local Government of Kogi State was the first civilian governor of the defunct Kwara State. She studied Politics and International studies at the University of Warwick and later worked as a Securities Trader at First Securities Discount House in Lagos between 1993 and 1997, after which she went on to establish her own security printing company in Lagos before she was appointed as Ghana's New Patriotic Party (NPP) Campaign Secretary in 2008. She was made Office Manager and Executive Assistant to Ghana's President-Elect, Nana Akufo-Addo and has remained in that position since 2009

Personal life 
In 1987, Saratu married a Nigerian politician, Femi Fani-Kayode, but the couple separated two years into the marriage in 1990. The marriage produced one child.

References

Living people
1956 births